Niki Karimi (born November 10, 1971) is an Iranian actress, director, screenwriter and producer. Regarded as "the most prominent figure among the young generations coming after the Iranian Revolution", she has received various accolades, including a Crystal Simorgh, three Hafez Awards, an Iran Cinema Celebration Award, and three Iran's Film Critics and Writers Association Awards.

Early life 
Niki Karimi was born in azerbaijani (turkish) family on November 10, 1971 in Tehran, Iran. Her parents are both from Tafresh. She has been active in theater since elementary school, and has said that her early interest in film and literature inspired her to become an actress.

Career

In 1990, she was cast as a young bride in Behrooz Afkhami's hit film The Bride.

Karimi began her career in the late 1980s. She received critical acclaim for her performance in Sara (1992), for which she won the best actress award at the San Sebastian Film Festival.

Karimi has won many awards nationally and internationally for "Sara" such as San Sebastian film festival award for best actress. She has also recently been on the jury for more than 20 renowned film festivals, including Karlovy Vary Film Festival, the Edinburgh International Film Festival, the Locarno International Film Festival and Thessaloniki International Film Festival and Berlin Film Festival and also the 60th Cannes Film Festival. She was the assistant of Abbas Kiarostami from 1992 to 2007.

Expanding on her career as an actor, she wrote and directed the documentary To Have or Not to Have (2001).

In 2001, she won her first award as a director in Iran's Rain film festival for her work To Have or Not to Have, which was produced by renowned Iranian filmmaker Abbas Kiarostami.

Nominated at the 2005 Cannes Film Festival for her feature film directorial debut One Night (2005), she said that acting no longer satisfied her and she would like to direct more movies.

In addition to the film, Karimi has also done some translating work. In 1999 she released her first translation work, Marlon Brando's biography Songs My Mother Taught Me, which she translated from English to Persian. She also translated two books by Hanif Kureishi, a Pakistani-English writer.

Her third film as director, Final whistle (2011), won three awards at the Vesoul International Film Festival of Asian Cinema in Vesoul , France.

She has been nominated for the best actress award in Fajr Film Festival in 2011 for I Am His Wife (2011), directed by Mostafa Shayesteh.

She has been awarded recently by the jury of the Iranian Fajr Film ّFestival for her last film as best director, actress and producer. She also got a jury award for acting in two films, Wednesday, May 9 and Death of Fish.

As a translator

As a film critic

Filmography

Film

Web

Television

Awards and nominations

See also 
 Iranian women
 Iranian cinema
 List of famous Persian women
 Persian women's movement
 Fajr International Film Festival

References

External links

Official Website

Profile on Cannes Film Festival website
Niki Karimi interview with Radio Zamaneh
Her filmography 
New York Times profile

Living people
1971 births
People from Tehran
Women film critics
Iranian translators
People from Tafresh
Women screenwriters
Iranian screenwriters
Actresses from Tehran
Iranian film actresses
Iranian film producers
Iranian stage actresses
Iranian women photographers
Iranian women film directors
Iranian television actresses
20th-century Iranian actresses
21st-century Iranian actresses
Crystal Simorgh for Best Actress winners